The Poorhouse Fair (1959) was the first novel by the American author John Updike. A second edition (New York : Knopf, 1977) included an introduction by the author and was slightly revised.

Plot
The residents of the Diamond County Home for the Aged prepare for their annual fair, a summer celebration at which they sell their crafts and produce to the people of the nearby town. The fair is at first rained out, and the young prefect, Conner, turns the "inmates" against him by arguing with the noble Hook (94 years old, a former teacher with strong religious beliefs). After the rain clears, some residents fling small stones at  Conner. The novel examines the political and religious dialectics that exist among its characters and their respective generations.

Critical reception
The novel has been overshadowed by Updike's more popular works, and reviews have been mixed. As examples, Donald Barr of The New York Times deemed it "a work of intellectual imagination and great charity,"  while Commentary called it a "hearty but not very successful try at a first novel."

References

1959 American novels
Novels by John Updike
Alfred A. Knopf books
Novels set in New Jersey
1959 debut novels
Novels set in one day